Lisa Greenwood (born 1955) is a New Zealand novelist. She was the 1990 recipient of the Katherine Mansfield Menton Fellowship, one of New Zealand's foremost literary awards.

Early life

Greenwood was born in Westmere, New Zealand. She lives in Auckland and has one daughter, born in 1977.

Literary career

Greenwood's first novel, The Roundness of Eggs, was published in 1986. It is the story of a 52-year-old woman undergoing a psychological crisis. A second edition was published in the UK by feminist publishing company The Women's Press. Journalist Pauline Willis, reviewing the novel for The Guardian, commented that it was an "auspicious start for a young New Zealand novelist, following in the tradition of Janet Frame", and observed that it was interesting that a young women should "choose to explore an older woman's problems".

Her second novel, Daylight Burning, was published in 1990. This book is described by the Oxford Companion to New Zealand Literature as " a powerful and darkly bizarre account of an Auckland businessman whose yuppie life is transformed by an apparently prophetic vision of Auckland destroyed by nuclear holocaust".

In 1990, Greenwood spent time working on a novel in Menton, France as the recipient of the Katherine Mansfield Menton Fellowship.

References

External links
Lisa Greenwood, profile on the Arts Foundation of New Zealand website

Living people
1955 births
New Zealand novelists
New Zealand women novelists
20th-century New Zealand novelists